HD 108147, or Tupã, is a 7th magnitude star in the constellation of Crux in direct line with and very near to the bright star Acrux or Alpha Crucis. It is either a yellow-white or yellow dwarf (the line is arbitrary and the colour difference is only from classification, not real), slightly brighter and more massive than the Sun. The spectral type is F8 V or G0 V. The star is also younger than the Sun. Due to its distance, about 126 light years, it is too dim to be visible with unaided eye; with binoculars it is an easy target. However, due to its southerly location it is not visible in the northern hemisphere except for the tropics.

An extrasolar planet was detected orbiting it in 2000 by the Geneva Extrasolar Planet Search Team.  This exoplanet is "a gas giant smaller than Jupiter that screams around its primary [star]  in 11 days at only 0.1 AU." This is much closer than the orbit of Mercury in the Solar System.

In December 2019, the International Astronomical Union announced the star will bear the name Tupã, after the God of the Guarani people's of Paraguay. The name was a result of a contest ran in Paraguay by the Centro Paraguayo de Informaciones Astronómicas, along with the IAU100 NameExoWorlds 2019 global contest.

It should not be confused with HD 107148, which also has an extrasolar planet discovered in 2006 in the Virgo constellation.

See also
 List of extrasolar planets

References

External links

F-type main-sequence stars
G-type main-sequence stars
108147
060644
Crux (constellation)
Planetary systems with one confirmed planet
Durchmusterung objects